Rakowiec is a neighbourhood in Warsaw, the capital of Poland. Part of the borough of Ochota, it originally was a separate village, established in the Middle Ages. Nationalised by the Russian authorities in the late 19th century, the village was occupied by one of the forts of the Warsaw Fortress. After Poland regained her independence, in 1930 the area was incorporated into Warsaw, and residential areas were soon built there. 

Neighbourhoods of Ochota